São José do Divino  may refer to the following places in Brazil:

São José do Divino, Minas Gerais
São José do Divino, Piauí